Faustino Amiano (15 February 1944 – 1 December 2020) was a Spanish rower. He competed in the men's eight event at the 1960 Summer Olympics.

References

1944 births
2020 deaths
Spanish male rowers
Olympic rowers of Spain
Rowers at the 1960 Summer Olympics
Sportspeople from San Sebastián
Rowers from the Basque Country (autonomous community)